This is a list of the largest known epidemics and pandemics caused by an infectious disease. Widespread non-communicable diseases such as cardiovascular disease and cancer are not included. An epidemic is the rapid spread of disease to a large number of people in a given population within a short period of time; in meningococcal infections, an attack rate in excess of 15 cases per 100,000 people for two consecutive weeks is considered an epidemic. Due to the long time spans, the first plague pandemic (6th century – 8th century) and the second plague pandemic (14th century – early 19th century) are shown by individual outbreaks, such as the Plague of Justinian (first pandemic) and the Black Death (second pandemic).

Major epidemics and pandemics

By death toll
For a given epidemic, the average of its estimated death toll range is used for ranking. If the death toll averages of two or more epidemics are equal, then the smaller the range, the higher the rank. For the historical records of major changes in the world population, see world population.

Depopulation of the Americas

Not included in the above table are many waves of deadly diseases brought by Europeans to the Americas and Caribbean. Western Hemisphere populations were decimated mostly by smallpox, but also typhus, measles, influenza, bubonic plague, cholera, malaria, tuberculosis, mumps, yellow fever, and pertussis. The lack of written records in many places and the destruction of many native societies by disease, war, and colonization make estimates uncertain. Deaths probably numbered in the tens or perhaps over a hundred million, with perhaps 90% of the population dead in the worst-hit areas. Lack of scientific knowledge about microorganisms and lack of surviving medical records for many areas makes attribution of specific numbers to specific diseases uncertain.

Infectious diseases with high prevalence

There have been various major infectious diseases with high prevalence worldwide, but they are currently not listed in the above table as epidemics/pandemics due to the lack of definite data, such as time span and death toll.
 Tuberculosis (TB) became epidemic in Europe in the 18th and 19th century, showing a seasonal pattern, and is still taking place globally. The morbidity and mortality of TB and HIV/AIDS have been closely linked, known as "TB/HIV syndemic". According to the World Health Organization, approximately 10 million new TB infections occur every year, and 1.5 million people die from it each year – making it the world's top infectious killer (before COVID-19 pandemic). However, there is a lack of sources which describe major TB epidemics with definite time spans and death tolls.
 According to the World Health Organization,  there are about 296 million people living with chronic hepatitis B, with 1.5 million new infections each year. In 2019, hepatitis B caused about 820,000 deaths, mostly from cirrhosis and hepatocellular carcinoma (primary liver cancer). In many places of Asia and Africa, hepatitis B has become endemic. In addition, a person is sometimes infected with both hepatitis B virus (HBV) and HIV, and this population (about 2.7 million) accounts for about 1% of the total HBV infections.
 According to the World Health Organization, there are approximately 58 million people with chronic hepatitis C, with about 1.5 million new infections occurring per year. In 2019, approximately 290,000 people died from the disease, mostly from cirrhosis and hepatocellular carcinoma (primary liver cancer). There have been many hepatitis C virus (HCV) epidemics in history.

Chronology

See also

Explanatory notes

References

Further reading
 Barry, John M. The Great Influenza. New York: Viking Penguin, 2018 ("Spanish flu" epidemic 1918–1919).
 Defoe, Daniel. A Journal of the Plague Year. Zweihandler Press, 2019 (London bubonic plague 1665).
 Eisenberg, Merle, and Lee Mordechai. "The Justinianic Plague and Global Pandemics: The Making of the Plague Concept." American Historical Review 125.5 (2020): 1632–1667.
 Fenn, Elizabeth A. Pox Americana: The Great Smallpox Epidemic of 1775–82. New York: Hill & Wang, 2001.
 
 
 
 Seager, Nicholas. "Lies, Damned Lies, and Statistics: Epistemology and Fiction in Defoe's 'A Journal of the Plague Year'." The Modern Language Review (2008): 639–653.

External links 
 

 
Disease outbreaks
Globalization-related lists
Lists by death toll
Lists of disasters